Rowan Donaldson (born 6 September 1970) is a former Canadian and Jamaican boxer. Representing Jamaica, he competed in the men's middleweight event at the 1996 Summer Olympics. Earlier, while representing Canada, he won a gold medal in the 1994 Commonwealth Games in the middleweight category. He competed for Jamaica in the 1998 Commonwealth Games.

Donaldson attended Howard S. Billings Regional High School in Châteauguay, Quebec.

References

External links
 

1970 births
Living people
Middleweight boxers
Canadian male boxers
Jamaican male boxers
Commonwealth Games gold medallists for Canada
Boxers at the 1994 Commonwealth Games
Commonwealth Games competitors for Jamaica
Boxers at the 1998 Commonwealth Games
Commonwealth Games medallists in boxing
Olympic boxers of Jamaica
Boxers at the 1996 Summer Olympics
Black Canadian boxers
Canadian people of Jamaican descent
Sportspeople from Quebec
Anglophone Quebec people
People from Châteauguay
Place of birth missing (living people)
Medallists at the 1994 Commonwealth Games